Cyclostrema carinatum is a species of sea snail, a marine gastropod mollusk in the family Liotiidae.

Description
The diameter of the shell is 2.5 mm. The solid shell is widely umbilicated, with regular, angular spiral carinae. The interstices are radiately sculptured.  The 4 whorls are convex and rapidly increasing. The last whorl is dilated in front. The aperture is subcirciilar. The peristome is thickened and subcontinuous.

Distribution
This species occurs in the Persian Gulf.

References

 Trew, A., 1984. The Melvill-Tomlin Collection. Part 30. Trochacea. Handlists of the Molluscan Collections in the Department of Zoology, National Museum of Wales.

External links
 To World Register of Marine Species

carinatum
Gastropods described in 1873